The men's 10,000 metres at the 2022 World Athletics Championships was held at the Hayward Field in Eugene on 17 July 2022.

Summary

After sorting themselves through the break, Carlos Mayo took over the point, followed by world record holder Joshua Cheptegei and the full American contingent of Grant Fisher, Joe Klecker and Sean McGorty.  Near the back of the pack Stanley Mburu fell to the track, getting quickly to his feet and returning to the pack with a noticeable welt developing on his right knee.  For the next 8 laps, Mayo led them through a steady diet of 66 second laps.  On the third lap, Mburu was tripped again but kept upright.  Next to take over leading duties was Cheptegei's Ugandan teammate Stephen Kissa.  This move got the attention of Olympic Champion Selemon Barega who moved into the top group.  The two Ugandan's shared duties until just before the half way point when Barega moved to the front.  This brought the third Ugandan Jacob Kiplimo to take over.  Kiplimo opened up a few meters gap with a 64, only covered by Barega, but that was short lived as the next two laps were only 65.  The entire field was a single pack until about halfway, now a single file line as a few began to fall off the back, soon including early leader Kissa.  With 8 to go, Cheptegei again moved forward, marked by Barega while 15 remained in the pack behind them.  At the head of the pack Cheptegei actually slowed the pace to 68 seconds for a couple of laps before dropping it to 65 seconds with 3 to go and 63 seconds with 2 to go.  Four athletes lost contact with the pack.  On the penultimate lap, Berihu Aregawi ran a 60.3 to move up to the lead before the bell with Mburu splitting Cheptegei and Barega.  8 were still in contention at the bell.  Cheptegei took back the lead on the turn, down the backstretch Barega moved up onto his outside shoulder.  Cheptegei perceived the threat and opened up a metre gap through the final turn.  On the final sprint for home, Cheptegei opened up more space.  40 metres out, Mburu passed Barega.  A couple of steps later, Kiplimo went by.  And ten meters before the finish, Fisher passed Barega in full sprint, but couldn't catch Kiplimo for bronze.

Records
Before the competition records were as follows:

Qualification standard
The standard to qualify automatically for entry was 27:28.00.

Schedule
The event schedule, in local time (UTC−7), was as follows:

Results

References

10,000
10,000 metres at the World Athletics Championships